Michael James Ignasiak (born March 12, 1966) is a former Major League Baseball pitcher.

Career

Amateur
After graduating from St. Mary's Preparatory, Ignasiak attended the University of Michigan. In 1986 and 1987 he played collegiate summer baseball with the Orleans Cardinals of the Cape Cod Baseball League and was named an all-star both seasons. He was selected by the Milwaukee Brewers in the 8th round of the 1988 MLB Draft.

Professional
Ignasiak made his Major League debut on August 22, 1991, allowing two earned runs in 2.1 innings of relief against the Toronto Blue Jays. Ignasiak was credited with his first Major League win in that game. He would go on to appear in three more games (one as a start, two in relief) during the 1991 season, finishing with a 2–1 record and an ERA of 5.68. Ignasiak struck out 10 batters and walked 8 in 12.2 innings pitched.

Ignasiak spent the entire 1992 season in the minors, appearing in 62 games and pitching 92 innings for Milwaukee's Triple-A affiliate, the Denver Zephyrs. With Denver, Ignasiak went 6–2, with an ERA of 2.93 and 10 saves.

In 1993, Ignasiak split time between the Brewers and the New Orleans Zephyrs, who had relocated from Denver. With New Orleans, Ignasiak posted a 1.09 ERA in 35 appearances (57.2 innings), posting a 6–0 record and saving 9 games. At the major league level, Ignasiak saw action in 27 games (37 innings), with a 1–1 record, a 3.65 ERA, 28 K's and 21 walks.

During the 1994 season, Ignasiak spent most of his time in the majors, appearing in only 8 games for Triple-A New Orleans. With the Brewers, Ignasiak appeared in 23 games, making 5 starts. He posted a 3-1 record, with an ERA of 4.53 over 47.2 innings. Ignasiak struck out 24 batters and walked 13.

1995 would be Ignasiak's final season in the major leagues. In 25 appearances with the Brewers, Ignasiak posted a 4–1 record and a career-worst 5.90 ERA. Over 39.2 innings, he struck out 26 batters and walked 23.

Prior to the 1996 season, Ignasiak signed on with the Boston Red Sox. However, he suffered a career-ending back injury during Spring Training.

For his career, Ignasiak recorded a 4.80 ERA and a .714 win-loss percentage. He appeared in 79 games and threw 137 innings, striking out 88 batters and walking 65.

Personal life
Ignasiak is the younger brother of former major league pitcher Gary Ignasiak, who is 16 years older than Mike and appeared in 3 games for the 1973 Detroit Tigers. Ignasiak is now a successful amateur golfer and also owns a Dairy Queen franchise in Saline, Michigan.

References

External links

1966 births
Living people
American people of Polish descent
Baseball players from Michigan
Beloit Brewers players
Denver Zephyrs players
El Paso Diablos players
Helena Brewers players
Major League Baseball pitchers
Michigan Wolverines baseball players
Milwaukee Brewers players
New Orleans Zephyrs players
Orleans Firebirds players
People from Mount Clemens, Michigan
Sportspeople from Metro Detroit
Stockton Ports players